Scholartis Press was a small, private press in London, England, founded by Eric Partridge in 1927. The press closed in 1931, when the Great Depression began in Britain.

Writers published
William Blake, Poetical Sketches. With an Essay on "Blake's Metric" by Jack Lindsay, 1927 
Nicholas Breton, Melancholike humours. Edited, with an Essay on "Elizabethan melancholy", by G.B. Harrison
Richard Henry Horne, Orion, 1928
Elza de Locre, I See the Earth: Poems, 1928. Illustrated by Peter Meadows, pseudonym for Jack Lindsay
Norah Hoult, Poor Women!, 1928
Nicholas Rowe, Three plays: Tamerlane, The Fair Penitent, Jane Shore, 1929
Laurence Sterne, A Sentimental Journey. Edited with Introduction and Notes by Herbert Read, 1929
Edmund Spenser, Daphnaïda and other poems, 1929
Horace Walpole, The Castle of Otranto, 1929
Maude Meagher, White Jade, 1930
George Sand, The Country Waif and "The Castle of Pictordu", tr. Eirene Collis, 1930
Irene Clyde, Eve's Sour Apples, 1934
Edmund Spenser, A view of the State of Ireland, 1934

References

Where not otherwise specified, title from WorldCat.

Book publishing companies of the United Kingdom
Publications established in 1927